"Hail! Spartans, Hail!" is the official alma mater of San José State University in San José, California. The lyrics to the song were written by Gerald Erwin, a 1933 graduate of the school. Erwin was a music major who also served as the student director of the San Jose State glee club. According to the 1929 edition of the SJSU La Torre yearbook, the song was officially adopted as the school hymn on February 25, 1929. Whenever the SJSU Alma Mater is played, students are asked to stand, remove their hats and sing along.

Lyrics
Hail, Spartans, Hail!
Hail, gold, blue and white!
We pledge our hearts and hands,
To keep thy colors ever bright,
Forward we go! We will not fail!
Sing to our Alma Mater,
Hail! Hail! Hail!

Fight song

The university also has a fight song, which is typically played and/or sung at the end of football games and other athletic events including pep rallies.

References 

San Jose State University
Alma mater songs
American college songs